Tahura Ali is a Bangladesh Awami League politician and a former Member of Parliament.

Early life
Ali completed her master's degree from the University of Chittagong in chemistry in 1987. Ali is the director of finance of Citizen Cables limited. She was also a lecturer at Habibullah Bahar University College.

Career
Ali served in the 9th parliament of Bangladesh and was a Member of Standing Committee on Ministry of Commerce in Parliament. She served in the parliament from 1996 to 2001 and was elected again from Jamalpur for a second term. In 2009, she was selected for a position in the reserved seats for women in Bangladesh parliament.

Personal life
Ali is married to Mohammad Ali. Her daughter, Meher Afroz Shaon is an actress. Her Son in law Humayun Ahmed was popular Novelist and writer.

References

Living people
Awami League politicians
University of Chittagong alumni
7th Jatiya Sangsad members
8th Jatiya Sangsad members
9th Jatiya Sangsad members
Year of birth missing (living people)
Women members of the Jatiya Sangsad
20th-century Bangladeshi women politicians
21st-century Bangladeshi women politicians